Chai Jingyi (17th-century), was a Chinese poet and painter. She produced two collections of poems, and was also known for her paintings of flowers.
She was a member of the aristocracy and the daughter of Chai Yunqian, sister of Chai Zhenyi, spouse of Shen Hajia, and mother of Shen Yongji and Shen Zazhi. She was the chairperson of the famous women's literary club Jiaoyan qizi (Banana Garden).

References 
 

17th-century births
17th-century deaths
17th-century Chinese poets
Qing dynasty painters
Chinese women poets
Qing dynasty poets
17th-century Chinese women artists
17th-century Chinese painters
17th-century Chinese women writers